is a railway station on the Hisatsu Line in Yatsushiro, Kumamoto, Japan, operated by Kyushu Railway Company (JR Kyushu).

Lines
Dan Station is served by the Hisatsu Line.

Layout
The station has one platform serving a two-way track.

Adjacent stations

See also
 List of railway stations in Japan

External links

  

Railway stations in Kumamoto Prefecture